Bartolo "Buddy" Valastro Jr. (born March 3, 1977) is an American baker and reality television personality of Italian heritage. He is the owner of Carlo's Bakery, as well as the face of Buddy V's Ristorante. Valastro is best known as the star of the reality television series Cake Boss, which premiered in April 2009. He has also starred in Next Great Baker (2010), Kitchen Boss (2011), Buddy's Bakery Rescue (2013), Bake You Rich (2013), Bakery Boss (2013), Buddy vs. Duff (2019), and Buddy vs. Christmas (2020).

Early life
Valastro was born in Hoboken, New Jersey, and grew up there and in Little Ferry, New Jersey. His mother was born in Altamura, Italy, and is the daughter of Italian-American immigrants who moved to New Jersey when she was six years old. His father, Buddy Sr was born in Lipari, Italy. Valastro grew up with four sisters: Grace, Mary, Maddalena and Lisa.

He attended Ridgefield Park High School and took baking courses at the Bergen County Technical High School, Teterboro Campus.

Valastro began working at his family's business, Carlo's Bakery at age 11, alongside his father. When his father died in 1994, Valastro was 17. Valastro took over the family business.

Career 

Valastro is the owner and head baker of Carlo's Bakery, the bakery featured on the TLC show Cake Boss. Carlo's has since opened 17 more bakeries due to the popularity of the show. In January 2012, as a result of the attention that the shop and the TV series had brought to the city of Hoboken, the Hudson Reporter named Valastro as an honorable mention in its list of Hudson County's 50 most influential people.

Carlo's Bakery has seven locations in New Jersey—Hoboken, Marlton, Morristown,  Red Bank, Ridgewood, Wayne, and Westfield. Outside of New Jersey, the bakery operates locations in Philadelphia, Pennsylvania; Bethlehem, Pennsylvania; Westbury and New York, New York; Orlando, Florida; San Antonio, and The Woodlands, Texas; São Paulo, Brazil; Uncasville, Connecticut; Las Vegas and most recently in Minneapolis, Minnesota. The Lackawanna Factory in nearby Jersey City serves as the corporate office for the business and is used as additional space to create wedding and specialty cakes, and to bake specialty baked goods for shipment across the country.

Valastro launched an event planning and catering company, Buddy V's Events, in June 2014.

In 2016 Valastro partnered with Whole Earth Sweetener Co. on the campaign "Rethink Sweet." The company said Valastro would serve as brand ambassador for a "new line of zero- and lower-calorie sweeteners, and will work to help his fans make healthy lifestyle choices", and provide recipes using the product.

In 2018 Valastro partnered with The Pound Bakery, a pet treat manufacturing company to redesign and launch a new line of pet treats. "We wanted to create palatable treats for dogs that are inspired by classic Italian entrees and desserts," said Lexie Berglund, President of The Pound Bakery. Buddy also worked with several other companies to launch a full line of ready-to-use fondant, buttercream icing, and Italian Biscotti cookies under the new brand name Buddy Valastro Foods in 2018.

Valastro, a supporter of the Special Olympics, baked a commemorative cake for the 2011 announcement that the 2014 Special Olympics USA National Games would be held in New Jersey.

Personal life
Buddy and Lisa Valastro married on October 14, 2001. Until 2014,  Valastro resided in East Hanover Township, New Jersey, with their four children: Sofia, Bartolo "Buddy" III, Marco, and Carlo. He has four sisters and a stepfather, Sergio. His brother-in-law is Maurizio Belgiovine. As of 2014, he resided in Montville, New Jersey.

On November 13, 2014, Valastro was arrested for driving while intoxicated. His driver's license was suspended for 90 days, and he paid a $300 fine.

In September 2020, Valastro had his right (dominant) hand impaled by a pinsetter at his home bowling alley. His sons and other family members rescued him by cutting him out of the machine. He underwent two emergency surgeries.

Politics
Valastro supported and campaigned for Republican Governor Chris Christie in his 2013 re-election bid, and in 2014 baked his birthday cake. He also endorsed Christie's 2016 presidential campaign.

Filmography

Television

As producer

In popular culture
Comedian Paul F. Tompkins plays a parody of Buddy Valastro on the Comedy Bang! Bang! podcast and the IFC TV show.

See also
 List of pastry chefs

References

External links

Carlo's Bakery Shop official website
Buddy V's Events official website
CakeHouse Media official website
Buddy Valastro Foods official website

1977 births
American chefs
American male chefs
American bakers
Pastry chefs
American people of Italian descent
People from East Hanover, New Jersey
People from Hoboken, New Jersey
People from Little Ferry, New Jersey
People from Montville, New Jersey
Living people
Participants in American reality television series
Ridgefield Park High School alumni